Greta J. Binford is a United States arachnologist, specialising in studies of spider venom. She is a Professor of Biology at Lewis & Clark College in Portland, Oregon.

As a child, Binford was raised on a small corn-and-soybean farm in west-central Indiana. From 1983 to 1985 she studied psychology at Purdue University, after an abortive attempt at a degree in veterinary medicine. While qualifying to be a science teacher at Miami University, she was offered the chance to study spiders in Peru's Amazon basin for the summer, and obtained a B.A. in Zoology at Miami in 1990. Afterwards, she undertook post-graduate studies at the University of Utah from 1991–1993, obtaining an M.S. in Biology in 1993. She obtained a PhD from the University of Arizona in 2000.

She joined Lewis & Clark as an Assistant Professor in 2003, becoming Associate Professor in June 2009. She was named Oregon Professor of the Year for 2011, and is the subject of the 2011 children's book Silk and Venom: Searching for a Dangerous Spider, by Kathryn Lasky and the photographer Christopher G. Knight. She sits on the editorial board of the open-access scientific journal Toxins.

The species of spider Austrarchaea binfordae, found in New South Wales, Australia, is named in her honour, "for her pioneering research on spider venoms and for contributing to a highly successful basal clades tour".

References

External links

Media appearances 

 Greta Binford: Spider Woman (2007)
 Crypto-What? 5 Things You Should Know About Oregon's Newly Anointed Arachnid (2016)
 Media at Science Friday (various)

Year of birth missing (living people)
Place of birth missing (living people)
Living people
Arachnologists
American arachnologists
Lewis & Clark College faculty
Purdue University alumni
Miami University alumni
University of Utah alumni
University of Arizona alumni